The Ebebiyín Cathedral is a religious building belonging to the Catholic Church and is located in the province of Kié-Ntem in the northeast of the mainland (Región Continental) of Equatorial Guinea near its border with Cameroon and Gabon.

Background 
It is one of the three cathedrals currently operating in that country, the others being: Bata and Malabo. It was completed in 1950.

It was built in Gothic style and is the seat of the Roman Catholic Diocese of Ebebiyin (also known in Latin as: dioecesis Ebebiyinensis and established on October 15, 1982) included in the ecclesiastical province of Malabo (Provincia eclesiástica de Malabo).

See also
Roman Catholicism in Equatorial Guinea
St. Elizabeth's Cathedral, Malabo

References

1950 establishments in Spanish Guinea
Roman Catholic cathedrals in Equatorial Guinea
Ebibeyin
Roman Catholic churches completed in 1950
20th-century Roman Catholic church buildings
Gothic Revival church buildings in Equatorial Guinea